Kristian Jensen (24 March 1889 – 21 October 1974) was a Danish equestrian. He competed in the individual dressage event at the 1952 Summer Olympics.

References

1889 births
1974 deaths
Danish male equestrians
Danish dressage riders
Olympic equestrians of Denmark
Equestrians at the 1952 Summer Olympics